Paracelsus is a 1943 German drama film directed by G. W. Pabst, based on the life of Paracelsus.

Cast

References

External links

1943 films
1943 drama films
1940s biographical drama films
1940s German-language films
German biographical drama films
German black-and-white films
Films of Nazi Germany
Films directed by G. W. Pabst
Films set in the Holy Roman Empire
Films set in the 16th century
Cultural depictions of Swiss men
Cultural depictions of physicians
Cultural depictions of chemists
Paracelsus
1940s German films